Paik Ok-ja or Baeg Ok-ja (born May 18, 1950) is a retired South Korean shot putter who won gold medals at the 1970 and 1974 Asian Games. She placed 13th–15th at the 1968 and  1972 Summer Olympics.

References

1950 births
Living people
South Korean female shot putters
Athletes (track and field) at the 1970 Asian Games
Athletes (track and field) at the 1974 Asian Games
Medalists at the 1970 Asian Games
Medalists at the 1974 Asian Games
Asian Games gold medalists for South Korea
Asian Games bronze medalists for South Korea
Olympic athletes of South Korea
Athletes (track and field) at the 1968 Summer Olympics
Athletes (track and field) at the 1972 Summer Olympics
Asian Games medalists in athletics (track and field)